Yancho Pavlov (born 25 October 1951) is a Bulgarian former wrestler who competed in the 1972 Summer Olympics and in the 1976 Summer Olympics.

References

External links
 

1951 births
Living people
Olympic wrestlers of Bulgaria
Wrestlers at the 1972 Summer Olympics
Wrestlers at the 1976 Summer Olympics
Bulgarian male sport wrestlers